Casino Lisboa is a hotel casino in Sé, Macau, owned by the Sociedade de Turismo e Diversões de Macau (STDM), a Stanley Ho company. This three-storey complex was built in late 1960s.

The original casino and the 12-storey round hotel tower were built in 1970 by Stanley Ho, Teddy Yip, Yip Hon and Henry Fok. A 270-room extension was added in 1991 for a total of 927 rooms. In 2006, another extension, the Grand Lisboa, was built next to the current complex. Therefore, a total of 2,362 rooms are in place in Hotel Lisboa as of 2010. This expansion was partly done in competition with the newly opened Wynn Macau, located right next to the original Casino Lisboa.

Robuchon á Galera

Robuchon á Galera, owned by the late chef Joël Robuchon, has been awarded three stars by the Michelin Guide in 2008. Robuchon á Galera serves European cuisine such as roasted guinea fowl and foie gras from its à la carte menu. The restaurant has since moved to the top floor of the Grand Lisboa hotel and has been renamed Robuchon au Dôme.

See also
 List of Macau casinos
 Macau gaming law
 Gambling in Macau

Gallery

References

Casinos completed in 1970
Hotel buildings completed in 1970
Hotel buildings completed in 1991
Hotel buildings completed in 2006
Casinos in Macau
Hotels in Macau
Macau Peninsula
Skyscrapers in Macau
Casino hotels
1970 establishments in Macau
Skyscraper hotels in Macau